KBS N Co., Ltd. is a South Korean company owned by the Korean Broadcasting System, producing media, broadcast and telecommunication products for non free-to-air networks used under permission registered due to KBS in 1996, including Skylife and Cable TV(KCTA) service providers.

History

Television networks 
 KBS Drama - drama's channel. Launched in 2002.
 KBS Joy - entertainment's channel. Launched in 2006.
 KBS N Sports - sports's channel. Launched in 2002.
 KBS Story - woman's channel. Launched in 2013.
 KBS Kids - children's channel. Launched in 2012.
 KBS Life - culture's channel. Launched in 2005.
 KBS N Plus - Life is a entertainment channel. Launched in 2017.

See also 
 List of South Korean companies
 Communications in South Korea

External links 
 © KBS N (Korean)

Korean Broadcasting System subsidiaries
Broadcasting companies of South Korea
Sports television networks in South Korea
Mass media companies established in 2001
Television channels and stations established in 1996